Elections to Rossendale Borough Council were held on 4 May 2000.  One third of the council was up for election and the Conservative party took overall control of the council from the Labour party.

After the election, the composition of the council was
Conservative 24
Labour 12

Election result

References
2000 Rossendale election result

2000
2000 English local elections
2000s in Lancashire